Nine-Christine Jönsson (8 June 1926 – 3 January 2011) was a Swedish film actress. She appeared in seven films between 1946 and 1952.

Filmography
 Ödemarksprästen (1946)
 Life in the Finnish Woods (1947)
 The Poetry of Ådalen (1947)
 Lars Hård (1948)
 Port of Call (1948)
 The Realm of the Rye (1950)
 In Lilac Time (1952)

References

External links

1926 births
2011 deaths
Swedish film actresses
Actresses from Stockholm
20th-century Swedish actresses